Richard Denning (March 27, 1914 – October 11, 1998) was an American actor who starred in science fiction films of the 1950s, including Unknown Island (1948), Creature from the Black Lagoon (1954), Target Earth (1954), Day the World Ended (1955), Creature with the Atom Brain (1955), and The Black Scorpion (1957). Denning also appeared in the film An Affair to Remember (1957) with Cary Grant and on radio with Lucille Ball in My Favorite Husband (1948–1951), the forerunner of television's I Love Lucy.

Early years
Denning was born as Louis Albert Heindrich Denninger Jr., in Poughkeepsie, New York. When he was 18 months old, his family moved to Los Angeles. After attending Manual Arts High School, he earned a Master of Business Administration degree from Woodbury Business College in Los Angeles. Plans called for him to take over his father's garment manufacturing business, but he developed an interest in acting.  Denning enlisted  in the United States Navy during World War II and served on submarines.

Career

Denning was perhaps  best known for his recurring starring roles in science fiction and horror films of the 1950s, and playing husband opposite Lucille Ball on the radio series that led to I Love Lucy in which he was replaced by Desi Arnaz as Lucy's husband. 

Denning began acting in minor supporting and background roles through the 1930s and early 1940s until the start of World War II. According to Denning, his military service disrupted his acting career, and after his discharge it would be a year and a half before Paramount Pictures offered him more acting work. During that time, he and his family lived in a mobile home that he alternately parked at Malibu and Palm Springs.

Denning's unemployment ended when he was hired to star on the radio opposite Lucille Ball in My Favorite Husband. The CBS Radio sitcom ran for 124 episodes from July 23, 1948 through March 31, 1951 and would evolve into the groundbreaking television sitcom I Love Lucy. CBS wanted Denning to continue as the husband in the new sitcom but Lucille Ball insisted that her real life husband, Desi Arnaz, play the part. The radio stint, however, led to a role on CBS television's series adaptation of Mr. and Mrs. North.

On television, he starred as the title character in the 1950 syndicated adventure series Ding Howe and the Flying Tigers. He was cast as Dr. Greg Graham in the 1959 series, The Flying Doctor. He also starred as the title character in the detective series Michael Shayne (1960–1961) and shared title billing with Barbara Britton in the detective series Mr. and Mrs. North (1952–1954).

In 1964-1965, Denning played Steve Scott in the comedy series Karen. In later life, he had a recurring role as the fictitious governor of Hawaii, Paul Jameson, in the CBS television crime drama series, Hawaii Five-O (1968–1980), starring Jack Lord.

He appeared three times on the ABC religion anthology series Crossroads, as Dr. Ira Langston in "Chinese Checkers" (1955) and as the Reverend George Bolton in "The Bowery Bishop" and as the Reverend Lloyd E. Williams in "The Pure White Orchid" (both 1956).

In other activity on radio, Denning played Uncle Jack in It's a Crime, Mr. Collins (1956-1957) on the Mutual Broadcasting System. He also was the second actor to play Jerry North in the radio version of Mr. and Mrs. North.

Denning later appeared in several 'B' crime drama films before starring in science fiction and horror films. In 1957, he began the first of a series of television appearances, usually as a supporting character, though he did star briefly in two television dramas, The Flying Doctor (1959), and Michael Shayne (1960–61).

In 1968, Denning completed his last film, a comedy titled I Sailed to Tahiti with an All Girl Crew. Semi-retired and living on the island of Maui with his wife, Denning was contacted by producer Leonard Freeman, who offered him the supporting role as the governor of Hawaii in the TV detective series, Hawaii Five-O. In order to persuade Denning to sign on in the recurring role, Freeman guaranteed Denning five-hour days and a four-day work week.

Recognition
Denning has a star at 6932 Hollywood Boulevard in the Television section of the Hollywood Walk of Fame. It was dedicated on February 8, 1960.

Personal life

In 1942, Denning married 1940s horror film queen Evelyn Ankers (co-star of The Wolf Man, Ghost of Frankenstein and Son of Dracula), who retired from films at the age of 32 after they were married. He and Ankers had a daughter, Diana Denning (later Dwyer). After Ankers' death from cancer in 1985, he remarried to Patricia Leffingwell. Denning died of a heart attack at the age of 84 on October 11, 1998, while visiting relatives in Southern California. Denning and Ankers are buried at Makawao Veterans' Cemetery in Makawao, Hawaii.

Filmography

References

External links

 
 

1914 births
1998 deaths
Male actors from New York (state)
American male film actors
American male television actors
People from Poughkeepsie, New York
People from Escondido, California
American male radio actors
20th-century American male actors